Trinidad and Tobago competed at the 2020 Summer Olympics in Tokyo. Originally scheduled to take place from 24 July to 9 August 2020, the Games were postponed to 23 July to 8 August 2021, due to the COVID-19 pandemic. It was the nation's eighteenth appearance at the Summer Olympics, although it previously competed in four other editions as a British colony, and as part of the West Indies Federation.

The 2020 Olympics were somewhat of a disappointment for Trinidad and Tobago, as it was the first Olympics since 1992 that they failed to win any medals.

Competitors

Athletics
 
Athletes from Trinidad and Tobago further achieved the entry standards, either by qualifying time or by world ranking, in the following track and field events (up to a maximum of 3 athletes in each event).

The Trinidad and Tobago Olympic Committee confirmed on 30 July that Andwuelle Wright and Sparkle McKnight tested positive for COVID-19, and they will not participate in the competitions on 31 July.

Track & road events
Men

Women

Field events

Boxing

Trinidad and Tobago entered one male boxer into the Olympic tournament. With the cancellation of the 2021 Pan American Qualification Tournament in Buenos Aires, Argentina, Aaron Prince finished fourth in the men's middleweight division to secure a place on the Trinidad and Tobago team based on the IOC's Boxing Task Force Rankings.

Cycling

Road
For the first time in history, Trinidad and Tobago entered one rider to compete in the women's Olympic road race, by virtue of her top 100 individual finish (for women) in the UCI World Ranking.

Track
Following the completion of the 2020 UCI Track Cycling World Championships, Trinidad and Tobago entered at least one rider to compete in the men's sprint and keirin based on his final individual UCI Olympic rankings.

Sprint

Keirin

Judo

Trinidad and Tobago qualified one judoka for the women's heavyweight category (+78 kg) at the Games. Gabriella Wood accepted a continental berth from the Americas as the nation's top-ranked judoka outside of direct qualifying position in the IJF World Ranking List of June 28, 2021.

Rowing

Trinidad and Tobago qualified one boat in the women's single sculls for the Games by winning the bronze medal and securing the third of five berths available at the 2021 FISA Americas Olympic Qualification Regatta in Rio de Janeiro, Brazil.

Qualification Legend: FA=Final A (medal); FB=Final B (non-medal); FC=Final C (non-medal); FD=Final D (non-medal); FE=Final E (non-medal); FF=Final F (non-medal); SA/B=Semifinals A/B; SC/D=Semifinals C/D; SE/F=Semifinals E/F; QF=Quarterfinals; R=Repechage

Sailing
 
Sailors from Trinidad and Tobago qualified one boat in each of the following classes through the class-associated World Championships, and the continental regattas.

M = Medal race; EL = Eliminated – did not advance into the medal race

Swimming 
 
Swimmers from Trinidad and Tobago further achieved qualifying standards in the following events (up to a maximum of 2 swimmers in each event at the Olympic Qualifying Time (OQT), and potentially 1 at the Olympic Selection Time (OST)):

See also
Trinidad and Tobago at the 2019 Pan American Games

References

External links 

Nations at the 2020 Summer Olympics
2020
2021 in Trinidad and Tobago sport